

Associations based in Asia

 Iran Veterinary Organization
 Nepal Veterinary Association
 Perhimpunan Dokter Hewan Indonesia (Indonesian Veterinary Medicine Association)
 Bangladesh Veterinary Association

Associations based in Europe

 Association of Veterinary Anaesthetists
 British Veterinary Association

Associations based in North America

 American Animal Hospital Association
 American Association of Bovine Practitioners
 American Association of Mobile Veterinary Practitioners
 American Veterinary Medical Association
 Canadian Veterinary Medical Association
 Evidence-Based Veterinary Medicine Association
 Michigan Veterinary Medical Association
 Student American Veterinary Medical Association

Associations based in Oceania

 Australian Veterinary Association
 New Zealand Veterinary Nursing Association